Kuckles (Broome kriol for cockles) was an Australian band. They formed in 1981 by students from Broome, Western Australia studying at the Centre for Aboriginal Studies in Music in Adelaide. Their music moved from acoustic calypso toward an electric reggae/rock style.

They recorded an audition tape, Milliya Rumarra, which won them a trip to Germany to the Third Annual International Cologne Song Festival in 1982. They returned to Broome later that year and disbanded.

Kuckles contributed to Chi's musicals Bran Nue Dae and Corrugation Road.

Chi and Manolis later were part of a new band called Bingurr which is moonlight in Bardi. Pigram played with Scrap Metal and The Pigram Brothers.

Discography

Studio albums

Soundtrack albums

Awards and nominations

Deadly Awards
The Deadly Awards were an annual celebration of Australian Aboriginal and Torres Strait Islander achievement in music, sport, entertainment and community. They ran from 1995 to 2013.

 (wins only)
|-
| rowspan="2"| 1998
| Corrugation Road <small> (with Jimmy Chi and The Pigram Brothers)
| Excellence in Film or Theatrical Score 
| 
|-

References

 

Indigenous Australian musical groups
Western Australian musical groups
Musical groups established in 1981
Musical groups disestablished in 1982
People from Broome, Western Australia